Pseudoplexippus is a monotypic genus of Tanzanian jumping spiders containing the single species, Pseudoplexippus unicus. It was first described by Lodovico di Caporiacco in 1947, and is found only in Tanzania. The name is a combination of the Ancient Greek "pseudo-", meaning "false", and the salticid genus Plexippus.

References

Arthropods of Tanzania
Monotypic Salticidae genera
Salticidae
Spiders of Africa